CFR Ialoveni  is a Moldovan football club based in Mileștii Mici, Moldova. They play in the Moldovan "B" Division, the third division in Moldovan football in season 2012–2013 and won Division B North.

In 2013, the club renamed FC Viişoara to CFR Ialoveni.

Achievements
Divizia B
 Winners (5) Record: 2003–04, 2007–08, 2008–09, 2009–10, 2012–13

External links
 on Soccerway.com

Football clubs in Moldova
Association football clubs established in 1986
1986 establishments in the Moldavian Soviet Socialist Republic